Harry Bishop may refer to:
 Harry Bishop (politician) (c. 1869–1920), Alaskan politician
 Harry Gore Bishop (1874–1934), American writer

See also

Henry Bishop (disambiguation)
Harold Bishop (disambiguation)